Henry Haase (born 25 June 1993) is a German professional ice hockey defenceman, currently under contract with German side, Augsburger Panther of the Deutsche Eishockey Liga (DEL)

Playing career 
Haase came through the youth ranks of Eisbären Berlin and made his debut in Germany's top-flight Deutsche Eishockey Liga (DEL) during the 2011-12 season. In his second year, he won the German championship with the Eisbären squad.

After spending his entire playing career in Berlin, Haase was out of contract following the 2015–16 season and signed with fellow DEL side Düsseldorfer EG on 3 April 2016.

Haase played two seasons with Düsseldorfer EG before securing a one-year contract as a free agent with his third top flight DEL club, Augsburger Panther on 5 April 2018.

References

External links
 

1993 births
Living people
Augsburger Panther players
Düsseldorfer EG players
Eisbären Berlin players
German ice hockey defencemen
Ice hockey people from Berlin